Joseph Eron Irenas (July 13, 1940 – October 16, 2015) was a United States district judge of the United States District Court for the District of New Jersey.

Education and career

Born in Newark, New Jersey, Irenas received an Artium Baccalaureus degree from Princeton University in 1962 and a Juris Doctor from Harvard Law School in 1965, where he graduated cum laude. He was in private practice of law at McCarter & English in Newark from 1966 to 1992. He was also an adjunct professor at Rutgers University from 1985 to 1986, and again from 1988 to 2015.

Federal judicial service

On November 14, 1991, Irenas was nominated by President George H. W. Bush to a new seat on the United States District Court for the District of New Jersey created by 104 Stat. 5089. He was confirmed by the United States Senate on April 8, 1992, and received his commission on April 13, 1992. He assumed senior status on July 1, 2002 due to a certified disability.

Death

Irenas died on October 16, 2015, of injuries sustained in a fall at work on October 14, 2015, at Cooper University Hospital, in Camden, New Jersey.

References

Sources
 

1940 births
2015 deaths
Lawyers from Newark, New Jersey
Princeton University alumni
Harvard Law School alumni
Pingry School alumni
Rutgers University faculty
Judges of the United States District Court for the District of New Jersey
United States district court judges appointed by George H. W. Bush
20th-century American judges